Aaron Michael Miller (born August 11, 1971) is an American former professional ice hockey defenseman. Over the course of his 14-year career in the National Hockey League (NHL), Miller played for the Quebec Nordiques/Colorado Avalanche, the Los Angeles Kings and the Vancouver Canucks. In 2002, he was selected as a member of United States hockey team at the 2002 Winter Olympics, where he won a silver medal. Prior to making his professional debut, Miller earned a degree in business from the University of Vermont.

Early life
Miller was born and raised in Buffalo, New York. As a youth, he played in the 1984 Quebec International Pee-Wee Hockey Tournament with a minor ice hockey team from Buffalo. After playing forward at St. Francis High School and the Niagara Scenics in Buffalo, Miller was given a scholarship to the University of Vermont. Prior to attending the university, he was drafted 88th overall by the New York Rangers in the 1989 NHL Entry Draft. Miller was named team captain at the start of the 1992-93 season. He scored four goals and 13 assists in 30 games over the year, and was named to both the ECAC First All-Star Team and the NCAA East Second All-American Team. After four years at Vermont, he graduated with a degree in business. He finished his university career with 11 goals and 62 points in 122 games, later being named to Vermont's All-Time Men's Hockey Team, "The ECAC Years".

Professional career

Quebec Nordiques/Colorado Avalanche
Though he was drafted by the Rangers in 1989, Miller opted to go to university and complete his degree. It was while he was at university that Miller was traded by the Rangers. On January 17, 1991, he was sent to the Quebec Nordiques (along with the Rangers' fifth-round draft pick, used to select Bill Lindsay) in the 1991 NHL Entry Draft in exchange for Joe Cirella.

After graduating from university, Miller made his professional debut in 1993 for the Nordiques minor league affiliate, the Cornwall Aces of the American Hockey League (AHL). On January 15, 1994, he made his NHL debut in Quebec against the Washington Capitals. Miller's first professional season ended with 1 NHL and 64 AHL games, where he scored four goals and ten assists. The next season, he appeared in nine games for the Nordiques, earning three assists. Miller also played 76 games for the Aces, finishing with totals of 4 goals and 22 points.

On June 21, 1995, the Quebec Nordiques transferred to Denver and became the Colorado Avalanche. Miller joined the team in Colorado and split the 1995–96 season between Colorado and Cornwall. In 62 games with Cornwall, he had 4 goals and 23 assists while going scoreless in five games with the Avalanche. Because he did not appear in enough games, Miller was not considered as part of the Stanley Cup-winning Avalanche team.

The 1996–97 season was Miller's first full season in the NHL. In a game against the Chicago Blackhawks on October 11, 1996, Miller scored his first NHL goal. He finished with 5 goals and 17 points while appearing in 56 games for the Avalanche, and his plus-minus was a +15, the best in the NHL for rookies. It also marked the Miller's Stanley Cup playoffs, where he registered 1 goal and 2 assists in 17 playoff games. The following season, he had 4 points in 55 games for the Avalanche, while going pointless in seven playoff games. Miller had his most productive season in 1998–99. After scoring a career-high 18 points in 76 games, Miller participated in 19 playoff games with a career-best five assists and six points. He would only play in 53 games the next season, but did suit up for every playoff game, scoring 1 goal and 1 assist in 17 games.

After 56 games with the Avalanche during the 2000–01 season, where he had 13 points, Miller was traded for the second time in his career. On February 21, 2001, Miller was sent to the Los Angeles Kings alongside Adam Deadmarsh, a player later to be named (Jared Aulin, who would be traded on March 22, 2001) and Colorado's first-round draft picks in the 2001 (Dave Steckel) and 2003 (Brian Boyle) Entry Drafts in exchange for Rob Blake and Steven Reinprecht. Miller was not originally meant to be traded, but the Kings insisted he be part of the deal.

Los Angeles Kings
Miller would finish the 2000–01 season with the Kings. In the final 13 games of the regular season, he had five assists, finishing with a career-best 14 assists and matching his career high of 18 points in one season. He contributed an assist in 13 playoff games as the Kings played the Avalanche, Miller's former team, who defeated Los Angeles as they went on to win the Stanley Cup for the second time.

In his first full season with the Kings, Miller played in 74 games for the team, scoring 5 goals and 12 assists during the 2001–02 season. At the conclusion of the regular season, Miller was named the winner of several Kings team awards: best defenseman, best defensive player and the teams unsung hero. During the playoffs, he went pointless while playing in all seven of the Kings' games. Abdominal surgery and a broken foot limited Miller to 49 games with the Kings the next season, recording one goal and five assists for six points.

In a game against the Atlanta Thrashers on December 10, 2003, Miller injured his neck. It would lead him to miss most of the 2003–04 season, appearing in 35 games and scoring one goal and two assists. The 2004–05 NHL lockout resulted in a cancelled 2004–05 season. Unlike many other players, Miller did not play in a different league. He returned to play for the 2005–06 season and earned eight assists in 56 games. For the first time in his career, Miller played in all 82 games during the 2006–07 season, again scoring eight assists.

Vancouver Canucks
As an unrestricted free agent, Miller signed a one-year, $1.5 million contract with the Vancouver Canucks on July 9, 2007, ending his time with the Kings. On December 18, 2007, Miller scored a goal against Martin Brodeur of the New Jersey Devils, his first goal in 193 games, a span lasting over four years. The goal, the game-winner, marked the longest stretch of Miller's career between scoring goals. In a game on March 6 against the Nashville Predators, Miller injured his shoulder and ultimately missed the remainder of the season. Following the conclusion of the 2007–08 season, in which he had eight assists in addition to the goal, Miller retired from professional hockey. In 2000, Miller had his first child, Grace Miller

International play

Aaron Miller has appeared for the United States in several international tournaments. His first appearance was at the 1991 World Junior Ice Hockey Championships. He scored a goal and an assist in eight games. Miller was also chosen to play in the 2002 Olympic Winter Games in Salt Lake City. In six games, Miller went pointless as the Americans won the silver medal, and experience he referred to as "best part of [his] career." Two years later, he joined the bronze medal-winning American team at the 2004 Men's World Ice Hockey Championships. He contributed an assist in nine games. Later that year he participated in the 2004 World Cup of Hockey, and appeared in 5 games. Miller made a return to the World Championships in 2005, playing seven games and scoring two assists. He was named to the 2006 Olympic Winter Games in Turin, but pulled out due to back problems.

Post-retirement
Miller resides in South Burlington, Vermont and is the owner of 11 Buffalo Wild Wings franchises with his business partner in Burlington; Concord, Manchester, and Nashua, New Hampshire; Southington, Waterbury, and Windsor, Connecticut; Chicopee, Massachusetts; and Plattsburgh, New York. He also provided color commentary for select Vermont Catamounts men's ice hockey radio broadcasts from 2009 to 2010 on AM 620, WVMT.

Career statistics

Regular season and playoffs

International

All stats taken from NHL.com

Awards

NCAA

Los Angeles Kings team awards

References

External links

1971 births
Living people
AHCA Division I men's ice hockey All-Americans
American men's ice hockey defensemen
Colorado Avalanche players
Cornwall Aces players
Ice hockey people from Buffalo, New York
Ice hockey players at the 2002 Winter Olympics
Los Angeles Kings players
Medalists at the 2002 Winter Olympics
New York Rangers draft picks
Olympic silver medalists for the United States in ice hockey
Quebec Nordiques players
Vancouver Canucks players
Vermont Catamounts men's ice hockey players